A speed record is a world record for speed by a person, animal, or vehicle. The function of speed record is to record the speed of moving animate objects such as humans, animals or vehicles.

Overall speed record 
Overall speed record is the record for the highest average speed regardless of any criteria, categories or classes that all the more specific records belong to, provided that the route was completed. It helps to compare various performances that differ by the type of the craft, vessel or vehicle, the departure and the arrival points (provided that the distances are comparable), number, age and gender of the crew members, departure date, etc. The distance used for calculating the overall speed record is usually the distance in a straight line. In the case of man-powered races, overall speed record doesn't always reflect the best performance. It is highly dependent on technological advantages generating the speed of the craft, vessel or vehicle.

Term Overall Speed Record is also used to compare the highest momentary speed achieved by a vehicle, vessel or craft in the highest land speed, water speed or air speed contest.

Vehicle speed records

 In the air
 Flight airspeed record 
 Cross-America flight air speed record
  Manned Spacecraft speed record

 On land
 Land speed record
 Land speed record for rail vehicles
 List of fastest production cars
 Motorcycle land-speed record
 Fastest speed on a bicycle
 British land speed record

 In the water
 Water speed record
 Speed sailing record
 Underwater speed record

Natural speed records
 List of world records in athletics
 List of speed skating records
 Fastest known time
 Fastest animals

See also
Orders of magnitude (speed)
Transport
Transportation engineering
Energy efficiency in transport

References

Velocity
World records